Khaling (kʰɛ̂l brâː ख्या:ल् ब्रा:) is a Kiranti language spoken in Solukhumbu district, Nepal and Sikkim, Darjeeling, and Kalimpong in India. It is one of the few Kiranti languages with tonal contrasts, which are of secondary origin.

Khaling has approximately 15,000 speakers and is therefore considered a vulnerable language. Khaling has a complex system of stem alternations: as many as 10 distinct stems have to be posited for a word (Jacques et al. 2012).  Khaling is very unusual in having an auditory demonstrative (see Jacques and Lahaussois 2014). Khaling is also known as Rai, Khalinge Rai, Khael Bra, and Khael Baat.

General information
Khaling is still being acquired by children who live in Khaling-speaking areas, as well as non-Khaling children who happen to live in that area.

Geographical distribution
Khaling is spoken in the following VDC's of Nepal (Ethnologue).

Solukhumbu District, Province No. 1: Kanku, Basa, Waku, Buksa, Jubing, Pawai and Phuleli villages
Khotang District, Province No. 1: Buipa Fuleli and Kharmi villages
Udayapur District, Province No. 1: Triyuga Municipality Gaighat, Basaha, Belter, Rampur city.
Sankhuwasabha District, Province No. 1: Tungkhaling village
Sunsari District, Province No. 1: Dharan
Ilam District, Province No. 1: Pang, Sumbek, and Mai Pokhari villages

See also
 Rai people

References

Further reading
Hale, Austin, editor. 1973. Collected papers on Khaling, Kulung, Darai, Newari, Chitwan Tharu. Nepal Studies in Linguistics, 1. Kirtipur: Summer Institute of Linguistics and Institute for Nepal and Asian Studies. vii, 87 p.
 
 
 
 
Jacques, Guillaume, Aimée Lahaussois, Dhan Bahadur Rai & Yadav Kumar. 2015. Khaling-Nepali-English Dictionary, version 1.0. Paris: Projet HimalCo. http://himalco.huma-num.fr/.
Toba, Sueyoshi and Ingrid Toba. 1972. Khaling phonemic summary. Tibeto-Burman Phonemic Summaries, 12. Kirtipur: Summer Institute of Linguistics and Institute of Nepal Studies, Tribhuvan University. 73 p.
Toba, Ingrid. 1973. "The Khaling verb." Nepal Studies in Linguistics 1: 1-14.
Toba, Sueyoshi and Ingrid Toba. 1975. A Khaling-English, English-Khaling glossary. Kathmandu: Summer Institute of Linguistics and Institute of Nepal and Asian Studies. xiii, 86 p.
 
Toba, Sueyoshi. 1981. Khaling texts. Tokyo: Institute for the Study of Languages and Cultures of Asia and Africa. 97 p.
Toba, Sueyoshi. 1983. Khaling Texts. YAK 7. Tokyo: Institute for the Study of Languages and Cultures of Asia and Africa
Toba, Sueyoshi. 1984. Khaling. Tokyo: Institute for the Study of Languages and Cultures of Asia and Africa
 
Hansson, G. (1991). The Rai of Eastern Nepal, Ethnic and Linguistic Grouping: Findings of the Linguistic Survey of Nepal. Linguistic Survey of Nepal and Centre for Nepal and Asian Studies, Tribhuvan University.

External links 
 Khaling Rai Song ; स्याल थन्न्य मो अो स्यो

Kiranti languages
Languages of Nepal
Languages of Koshi Province